H.H. Mir Ali Nawaz Khan Talpur (9 August 1884 - 25 December 1935), was 6th ruler of Sohrabani Talpur dynasty of Khairpur State from 1921 until 1935.

Biography 
He was born on 9 August 1884 to Mir Imam Bakhsh Khan Talpur and his wife who was daughter of Sahibzada Mir Shah Nawaz Khan Talpur. He was invested with title of Wali Ahad in 1910. He was educated at Aitchison College, Lahore. He was sent for military training to the Imperial Cadet Corps, Dehradun.  He visited Europe in 1911, accompanied by a Political Officer. He succeeded to the Gaddi on the death of his father on 8 February 1921 at Faiz Mahal, Khairpur. Many reforms were made during his reign. He took deep interest in all matters affecting the welfare of his subjects. He died on 25 December 1935.

References 

1884 births
1935 deaths
Talpur dynasty
Nawabs of Pakistan
Princely rulers of Pakistan